Fernando José Almeida Sequeira Ferreira (born 20 November 1986 in Viseu) is a Portuguese professional footballer who plays as a defensive midfielder.

References

External links

1986 births
Living people
People from Viseu
Sportspeople from Viseu District
Portuguese footballers
Association football midfielders
Primeira Liga players
Liga Portugal 2 players
Segunda Divisão players
Casa Pia A.C. players
S.C. Espinho players
Real S.C. players
Académico de Viseu F.C. players
C.D. Tondela players
C.F. Os Belenenses players
C.S. Marítimo players
Portugal youth international footballers